Hugh Howard Rowatt, CMG (August 17, 1861 – November 13, 1938) was a Canadian civil servant who served as the commissioner of the Northwest Territories between 1931 and 1934.

A civil servant with the Department of Interior, Howlatt was appointed Commissioner of the Northwest Territories on March 31, 1931, serving until April 30, 1934. At the age of 69, he remains the older person to ever be sworn into the office.

References

External links
 
Office of the Commissioner of the NWT: Past Commissioners
List of Canadian Leaders, births and deaths
Lieutenant Governors and Commissioners

Rowatt, Hugh
Rowatt, Hugh
Rowatt, Hugh
Canadian Companions of the Order of St Michael and St George
Canadian civil servants